Igor Alekseyevich Gusev (born 1 November 1975) is a Russian professional football coach and a former player.

Club career
He made his Russian Football National League debut for FC Saturn Ramenskoye on 30 March 1997 in a game against FC Neftekhimik Nizhnekamsk.

External links
 

1975 births
Living people
Russian footballers
Association football goalkeepers
Russia youth international footballers
FC FShM Torpedo Moscow players
FC Dynamo Moscow reserves players
FC Vityaz Podolsk players
FC Neftekhimik Nizhnekamsk players
FC Saturn Ramenskoye players
FC Zhenis Astana players
Kazakhstan Premier League players
Russian expatriate footballers
Expatriate footballers in Moldova
Russian expatriate sportspeople in Moldova
Expatriate footballers in Kazakhstan
Russian expatriate sportspeople in Kazakhstan